The second season of La Más Draga premiered on 30 April and concluded on 25 June 2019. The competition was broadcast on YouTube, and was produced by La Gran Diabla Producciones. The series featured nine contestants, from all over Mexico, competing for the title of La Más Draga of Mexico and Latin America and a cash prize of $100,000 MXN Pesos. The winner of the second season of La Más Draga was Alexis 3XL, with Gvajardo and Sophia Jiménez as runners-up.

The judges panel of this season include Puerto Rican singer and model Vanessa Claudio, who was also the main host, TV and Internet personality Johnny Carmona, hair and makeup artist Yari Mejía, and drag performer Bernardo "Letal" Vázquez.

The season consisted of nine one-hour episodes.

Contestants 
Ages, names, and cities stated are at time of filming.

{| class="wikitable sortable" style="text-align:center;"
|+Contestants of La Más Draga season 2 and their backgrounds
! scope="col"| Contestant
! scope="col"| Age
! scope="col"| Hometown
! scope="col"| Outcome
|-
! scope="row"| Alexis 3XL
| 25
| nowrap| Monterrey, Nuevo León
| 
|-
! scope="row"| Gvajardo
| 27
| Monterrey, Nuevo León
| rowspan="2"| 
|-
! scope="row"| Sophia Jiménez| 25
| Guadalajara, Jalisco
|-
! scope="row"| Job Star
| 27
| Saltillo, Coahuila
| 4th place
|-
! scope="row"| Soro Nasty
| 28
| Monterrey, Nuevo León
| 5th place
|-
! scope="row"| Amelia
| 21
| Mexico City
| 6th place
|-
! rowspan="2" scope="row"| Red Rabbit Duo
| 29
| rowspan="2" |Guadalajara, Jalisco
| rowspan="2" |7th place
|-
| 32
|-
! scope="row"| Leandra Rose
| 24
| Progreso, Yucatán
| 8th place
|-
! nowrap scope="row"| Nina De La Fuente
| 28
| Mexico City
| 9th place
|-
|}Notes Contestant progress 

A

Lip syncsNotes Judges 
 Main judges 
 Bernardo "Letal" Vázquez, drag queen and professional makeup artist
 Johnny Carmona, TV and Internet personality
 Yari Mejía, designer, stylist, singer and model

 Guest judges 
Listed in chronological order.

 Susana Zabaleta, soprano and actress
 Astrid Hadad, singer
 Regina Orozco, actress and singer
 Pepe y Teo, comedian duo and Internet personalities
 Pavel Arámbula, Chilenian drag performer
 Caelike, Internet personality
 Dulce, singer and actress
 Ricky Lips, drag performer and celebrity impersonator
 La Supermana, drag performer and singer

Special guests
Guests who will appear in episodes, but not judge on the main stage.Episode 2 Alejandro Reyes and Mario Bustamente, Impulse CDMX's representativesEpisode 3 Pimpinela Escarlata, luchador
 Mamba, luchadorEpisode 5 Juka, stylist and modelEpisode 6 Ophelia Pastrana, physicist, YouTuber and comedianEpisode 7 Christian Chávez, singer-songwriter and actorEpisode 9'''
 Bárbara Durango, runner-up on season 1
 Cordelia Durango, 7th place on season 1
 Deborah La Grande, winner of season 1
 Debra Men, 6th place and La Más Querida of season 1
 Eva Blunt, runner-up on season 1
 Lana, 5th place on season 1
 Margaret Y Ya, runner-up on season 1

Episodes
<onlyinclude>

References 

Mexican reality television series
Mexican LGBT-related television shows
Drag (clothing) television shows
Reality competition television series
2010s LGBT-related reality television series
2019 in LGBT history